The Juan Nepomuceno Garcia House, at 108 Bernard St. in Socorro, New Mexico, dates from 1880. It was listed on the National Register of Historic Places in 1991.

it is a one-story, adobe, flat-roofed building facing onto a plaza.  It has an interior placita (courtyard).

It is just south of the Juan Jose Baca House and Store.

References

National Register of Historic Places in Socorro County, New Mexico
Spanish Colonial architecture in New Mexico
Houses completed in 1880